Endeley is a surname. Notable people with the surname include:

E. M. L. Endeley (1916–1988), Cameroonian politician
Jimmy Endeley (born 1971), Swedish actor

See also
Endsley